Anna Alekseyevna Orochko (14 July 1898 – 26 December 1965) was a Soviet Russian stage and film actress, theatrical director, and acting teacher.

Life and career
Orochko was born in the village of Shushenskoye, Yeniseysk Governorate, where her family had been sent as political exiles. Anna's godparents were Vladimir Lenin and his wife Nadezhda Krupskaya, who had been exiled to the same village. Years later, visitors to Orochko's apartment would be puzzled to see portraits of Lenin and Krupskaya hanging among religious icons.

As a daughter of exiles, Orochko was forbidden to attend public schools under the Czarist regime. She graduated from a private high school in Tula in 1916. From 1916 to 1919 she studied agriculture in Moscow, at the same time pursuing a career in drama. In 1917 she was admitted to the Student Drama Studio under the direction of Yevgeny Vakhtangov, later founder of the Vakhtangov Theatre. Vakhtangov appreciated her abilities as a tragedian and cast her in many traditionally male roles, including Horatio and Hamlet.

During the Great Patriotic War, she performed for soldiers at the front lines, and was named a People's Artist of the Russian SFSR in 1947. In 1950 she received the Stalin Prize for her performance in Virta's "The Conspiracy of the Condemned".

Orochko is best remembered as an acting teacher and theatrical organizer. Beginning in 1922, she taught acting at the Vakhtangov School, later renamed the Boris Shchukin Theatre Institute. Her students included Vladimir Etush, Boris Khmelnitsky, Aleksandr Grave, and Alla Demidova. She was described as the "godmother" of the Taganka Theatre, because so many of its founding members had been her students. She died in Moscow and was buried at Novodevichy Cemetery.

Stage roles
 1922  – Turandot by Carlo Gozzi, directed by Yevgeny Vakhtangov  – Adelma
 1924  – Lev Gurych Sinichkin by Dmitry Lensky, directed by Ruben Simonov – Surmilova
 1926  – Marion Delorme by Victor Hugo, directed by Ruben Simonov  – Marion Delorme
 1926  – Zoya's Apartment by Mikhail Bulgakov, directed by Aleksei Popov  – Alla Vadymivna
 1930  – Intrigue and Love by Friedrich Schiller, directed by Pavel Antokolsky – Lady Milford
 1932  – Hamlet by William Shakespeare, directed by Nikolay Akimov – Gertrude
 1937  – Guilty Without Fault by Alexander Ostrovsky, directed Iosif Rapoport – Kruchinina
 1941  – Before Sunrise by Gerhard Hauptmann, directed by Alexandra Remizova – unknown role
 1944  – Rain by Alexander Ostrovsky, directed by Boris Zakhava – Madwoman
 1946  – Electra, directed by Yevgeniya Gardt – Electra
 1949  – Conspiracy of the Condemned by Nikolai Virta, directed by Ruben Simonov  – Hanna Licht

As director
 1930 – Tempo by Nikolai Pogodin
 1942 – The Immortal by Aleksei Arbuzov
 1942 – Our Correspondent by Izrail Metter
 1952 – The Two Gentlemen of Verona by Shakespeare

Film roles
 1918  – Bread, directed by Boris Sushkevich – unknown role
 1958  – Sampo, directed by Aleksandr Ptushko – Louhi
 1961  – Scarlet Sails, directed by Aleksandr Ptushko  – Neighbor of Longren

References

1898 births
1965 deaths
People from Krasnoyarsk Krai
People from Yeniseysk Governorate
Russian film actresses
Soviet film actresses
People's Artists of the RSFSR
Russian stage actresses
Soviet stage actresses
Stalin Prize winners
Burials at Novodevichy Cemetery